Pachyscia is a genus of Asian stick insects in the tribe Necrosciini, erected by Josef Redtenbacher in 1908.  Species have been recorded from Vietnam and China.

Species
The Phasmida Species File lists:
 Pachyscia bipunctata Redtenbacher, 1908
 Pachyscia dilatata (Chen & He, 2004)
 Pachyscia hainanensis Ho, 2013
 Pachyscia heishidingensis Ho, 2012
 Pachyscia longicauda (Bi, 1990)
 Pachyscia plagiata Redtenbacher, 1908 - type species (by subsequent designation: multiple localities in Vietnam)
 Pachyscia quadriguttata (Chen & He, 1996)

References

External links

Phasmatodea genera
Phasmatodea of Asia
Lonchodidae